Marian A. Van Landingham (born September 10, 1937) is American community leader, politician and artist. She served in the Virginia House of Delegates for 24 years and spearheaded the transformation of a decrepit former military storage building into the Torpedo Factory Art Center, in Alexandria, Virginia. In 2006 she was designated a Women's History Month Honoree by the National Women's History Project.

Personal life

Marian Van Landingham was born in Albany, Georgia and graduated from Druid Hills High School in Atlanta in 1955. She received her Bachelor of Arts and Master of Arts in political science at Emory University. In 1967 she moved to Arlington County, Virginia to work as an information specialist for the National Air Pollution Agency before moving to Alexandria to work under Phil Landrum. She is a member of her local Methodist church, is involved in numerous local neighborhood associations, served as vice chairman as the Alexandria Democratic Committee and is a Delta Kappa Gamma.
In December 2004, she was diagnosed with cancer, which led to her retirement in 2005. A painter, she lives and works in Alexandria, Virginia with her two dachshunds. In 2010 Van Landingham was honored as one of the Library of Virginia's "Virginia Women in History" because of her contributions to the arts.

Torpedo Factory

In 1973 Van Landingham proposed that a 20th-century, "leaky, drafty, pigeon infested" former military factory, located in Alexandria, Virginia, be transformed into an artist studio space and art center. The space would also provide regional artists an affordable option to the overpriced rental spaces of the area.

She served as the volunteer president for Alexandria's Art League, and she succeeded in convincing the city to fund the $140,000 for the renovation. Artists volunteered and cleaned out the building and creating studio spaces. The Torpedo Factory Art Center opened in 1974 with 140 artists. The Factory's renovation also helped trigger the revitalization of the city's waterfront along the Potomac River, housing 150 artists. By 2017, the art center had become the top tourist attraction in the city.

Virginia House of Delegates and community service

The Torpedo Factory Art Center was Van Landingham's first political campaign, which helped launch her political career in the Virginia House of Delegates, serving parts of Alexandria, Arlington and Fairfax. In 1980 she established Volunteer Alexandria, and in 1982 became a delegate. As a delegate, she has supported education and community based legislature to teach English as a second language, reduce class sizes and fund public schools with money from the lottery, and she has sought funding for the handicapped, homeless, and for poor families to obtain child care. Van Landingham was the first woman to chair the Privileges and Elections Committee, and served as chair of the transportation and public education subcommittees. She retired in 2005, leaving as Virginia's most senior female delegate and the 11th most senior member of the house. Mark Warner, who then served as Governor of Virginia, described her work in the house as being "the voice that would step up and argue for what was right," in a conservative legislature, "even those that didn't agree with her views had a great respect for her."

Van Landingham was an elector for Barack Obama and Joe Biden in the 2008 U.S. presidential election.

Notable awards

1974; Washingtonian of the Year
1979; Virginia Governor Award for the Arts
1992; Governor's Award for Fighting Drugs
1993; Virginia Interfaith Center for Public Policy Legislator of the Year
2006; Women's History Month Honoree
2010; Virginia Women in History honoree, Library of Virginia

Further reading

Van Landingham, Marian. On Target: Stories of the Torpedo Factory Art Center's First 25 years. Self-published (1999).

References

External links
Van Landingham's art on the Torpedo Factory website.
Biography of Van Landingham on the Library of Virginia's "Virginia Women in History" website

1937 births
21st-century American painters
American political scientists
Painters from Virginia
Emory University alumni
Living people
Democratic Party members of the Virginia House of Delegates
People from Albany, Georgia
Politicians from Alexandria, Virginia
American women painters
Women state legislators in Virginia
Artists from Georgia (U.S. state)
21st-century American women artists
20th-century American politicians
20th-century American women politicians
21st-century American politicians
21st-century American women politicians
Women political scientists